João Luís Peixoto Ribeiro  (born 19 August 1989) is a Portuguese sprint canoeist who has competed since the late 2000s. Together with Emanuel Silva, he won the gold medal in the K-2 500 metres event at the 2013 ICF Canoe Sprint World Championships and 2014 Canoe Sprint European Championships. At club level, he competes for Benfica.

References

External links

Canoe09.ca profile

1989 births
Living people
People from Esposende
Portuguese male canoeists
ICF Canoe Sprint World Championships medalists in kayak
Canoeists at the 2015 European Games
European Games competitors for Portugal
Canoeists at the 2016 Summer Olympics
Canoeists at the 2020 Summer Olympics
Olympic canoeists of Portugal
S.L. Benfica (canoeing)
Canoeists at the 2019 European Games
Competitors at the 2018 Mediterranean Games
Mediterranean Games competitors for Portugal
Sportspeople from Braga District